Agger is a Danish surname. Notable people with the surname include:

 Daniel Agger (born 1984), footballer
 Knud Agger (1895–1973), painter
 Mikkel Agger (born 1992), Danish footballer
 Nicolaj Agger (born 1988), footballer
 Poul Agger, canoer

Danish-language surnames